Marek is a surname. Notable people with the surname include:

Sports
 Henryk Marek (born 1939), Polish cross-country skier
 Jan Marek (ice hockey, born 1947), American ice hockey player
 Jan Marek (ice hockey, born 1979) (1979–2011), Czech ice hockey player
 Josef Marek (born 1987), Czech footballer
 Kamel Marek (born 1980), Algerian footballer
 Krzysztof Marek (born 1949), Polish rower
 Marcus Marek (born 1961), American football player
 Václav Marek (footballer) (born 1981), Czech football goalkeeper

Other people
 Christine Marek (born 1968), Austrian politician
 Czesław Marek (1891–1985), Polish composer
 Franz Marek (1913–1979), Austrian communist politician
 George Richard Marek (1902–1987), American biographer of classical composers
 Jan Jindřich Marek (1803–1853), also known as Jan z Hvězdy, Czech priest and poet
 Jeff Marek (born 1969), Canadian television personality and radio host
 Jiří Marek (1914–1994), Czech writer
 John Marek (born 1940), Welsh Conservative politician
 John Marek (murderer) (1961–2009), American death row inmate at Florida State Prison
 József Marek (1868–1952), Hungarian veterinarian
 Larry Marek (born 1940), Democratic politician
 Oldřich Marek (1911–1986), Czech entomologist and teacher
 Richard Marek (1933–2020), American writer, editor, and publisher
 Tadek Marek (1908–1982), Polish-British engineer
 Tadeusz Marek, pen name of Tadeusz Żakiej (1915–1994), Polish musicologist
 Václav Marek (writer) (1908–1994), Czech writer, traveller, publicist and researcher of Saami languages
 Victor W. Marek (born 1943), Polish mathematician and computer scientist
 Voitre Marek (1919–1999), Czech-born Australian artist, brother of Dusan

See also

Marek (given name)